King of All Kings is the second album by Florida death metal band Hate Eternal. It was released on September 16, 2002, by Earache Records and, like their debut, produced by the band's frontman Erik Rutan.

Track listing 
All songs by Erik Rutan except when noted. 
  "Our Beckoning"   – 0:49
  "King of All Kings"  – 2:49 (Rutan, Anderson)
  "The Obscure Terror"  – 3:53
  "Servants of the Gods"  – 2:56 
  "Beyond Redemption"  – 3:08 (Rutan, Anderson)
  "Born by Fire"  – 3:43 (Rutan, Anderson)
  "Chants in Declaration"  – 4:05 
  "Rising Legions of Black"  – 3:24 (Rutan, Anderson)
  "In Spirit (The Power of Mana)"  – 4:31
  "Powers That Be"  – 4:30

Personnel 
 Erik Rutan - guitars, lead vocals
 Jared Anderson - bass, backing vocals
 Derek Roddy - drums

References

External links 
 Hate Eternal official site

Hate Eternal albums
2002 albums
Albums produced by Erik Rutan
Earache Records albums